The Phantom of the Open is a 2021 British biographical comedy-drama film directed by Craig Roberts, about the exploits of Maurice Flitcroft. The screenplay by Simon Farnaby was based upon the biography The Phantom of the Open: Maurice Flitcroft, The World's Worst Golfer by Farnaby and Scott Murray. The film stars Mark Rylance, Sally Hawkins, Rhys Ifans, Jake Davies, Christian and Jonah Lees, Mark Lewis Jones and Johann Myers.

The Phantom of the Open had its world premiere at the 65th BFI London Film Festival on 12 October 2021, and was released in the United Kingdom on 18 March 2022, by Entertainment One. It received positive reviews.

Cast
 Mark Rylance as Maurice Flitcroft
 Sally Hawkins as Jean Flitcroft
 Rhys Ifans as Keith Mackenzie 
 Jake Davies as Michael Flitcroft
 Christian Lees as Gene Flitcroft
 Jonah Lees as James Flitcroft
 Mark Lewis Jones as Cliff
 Johann Myers as Willie
 Nigel Betts as Tony Marsh
 Steve Oram as Gerald Hopkins
 Tim Steed as John Pegg
 Simon Farnaby as Lambert

Production
In May 2020, it was announced Craig Roberts would direct the film, from a screenplay by Simon Farnaby based upon his biographical book The Phantom of the Open: Maurice Flitcroft, The World's Worst Golfer. Flitcroft's son, James, was used as a consultant. In June 2020, Mark Rylance joined the cast of the film. In October 2020, Sally Hawkins, Rhys Ifans, Jake Davies, Christian Lees, Jonah Lees, Mark Lewis Jones and Johann Myers, joined the cast of the film, with Entertainment One set to distribute in the United Kingdom.

Principal photography began in October 2020.

Release 
In July 2021, Sony Pictures Classics acquired the North America, Thailand, France and China rights to the film. It was released in the United States on June 3, 2022.

The Phantom of the Open had its world premiere at the 65th BFI London Film Festival on 12 October 2021.

Reception
On review aggregator Rotten Tomatoes, 86% of 134 critic reviews are positive, with an average rating of 7.10/10. The website’s critical consensus states, "Led by a stellar performance from Mark Rylance, The Phantom of the Open turns a stranger-than-fiction true story into crowd-pleasing entertainment."  Metacritic, which uses a weighted average, assigned the film a score of 65 out of 100 based on 11 critics, indicating "generally favorable reviews”. The Guardians Simran Hans rated the film 4/5, praising Rylance's decision to play his character straight, and complimenting the accompanying musical score.

References

External links
 

2021 films
2021 comedy-drama films
British biographical films
British comedy-drama films
British Film Institute films
BBC Film films
Entertainment One films
Sony Pictures Classics films
Films based on biographies
Films directed by Craig Roberts
2020s English-language films
2020s British films